Hagenbach is a town in the district of Germersheim, in Rhineland-Palatinate, Germany. It is situated near the border with France, on the left bank of the Rhine, approx. 10 km west of Karlsruhe.

Hagenbach is the seat of the Verbandsgemeinde ("collective municipality") Hagenbach.

References

Germersheim (district)